Cocotte may refer to:

 French oven, cocotte in French 
 Œufs cocotte, French term for shirred eggs
Montagne Cocotte, mountain in Mauritius
Cocotte (prostitute), a type of French prostitute

See also
Kokot (disambiguation)
Kokott (disambiguation)